Riho is both an Estonian masculine given name and a Japanese feminine given name. Notable people with the name include:

Estonia
Riho Breivel (born 1952), Estonian politician
Riho Kuld (born 1936), Estonian sculptor and rower
Riho Lahi (1904–1995), Estonian writer
Riho Päts (1899–1977), Estonian composer, choir director, music journalist and music teacher
Riho Sibul (born 1958), Estonian musician
Riho Suun (born 1960), Estonian cyclist
Riho Terras (born 1967), Estonian military commander
Riho Terras (mathematician) (1939–2005), Estonian-American mathematician
Riho Ühtegi (born 1964), Estonian brigadier general
Riho Västrik (born 1965), Estonian filmmaker, producer, screenwriter, journalist and historian

Japan
Riho (born 1997), Japanese professional wrestler
Riho Iida (born 1991), Japanese actress and model
Riho Makise (born 1971), Japanese actress
Riho Nakajima (born 1978), Japanese former synchronized swimmer
Riho Ōtake (born 1993), Japanese volleyball player
Riho Sayashi (born 1998), Japanese dancer and actress, 9th generation member of the pop group Morning Musume
Riho Sugiyama, Japanese voice actress

Estonian masculine given names
Japanese feminine given names